Gibbsville is a census-designated place in the town of Lima, Sheboygan County, Wisconsin, United States. Its population was 512 as of the 2010 census.

History
James, John and Benjamin Gibbs settled Gibbsville in 1836. A post office was in operation from 1846 to 1907, and a school was in operation from 1900 to 1977.

Notable people
Henry W. Timmer, Wisconsin State Assemblyman and businessman, was born in Gibbsville.

References

Census-designated places in Sheboygan County, Wisconsin
Census-designated places in Wisconsin